Witherow is a surname, and may refer to:

 Charles Witherow (1852–1948), American baseball pitcher 
 John Witherow (born 1952), British journalist,
 Peter Witherow (born 1987), Irish Gaelic football player

See also
 Withrow (disambiguation)

English-language surnames